Kim Yong-sik (김용식) may also refer to:
Kim Yong-sik (1910–1985), South Korean footballer
Kim Yong-shik (1913–1995), South Korean diplomat
Kim Yong-sik (wrestler) (김영식; born 1967), North Korean sport wrestler

See also
Kim Young-sik (김영식)